Hoag is a surname. Notable people with the surname include:

Arthur Hoag (1921–1999), American astronomer
Bob Hoag, American record producer and songwriter
Charles Hoag (1808–1888), American scholar and teacher; first school master of Minneapolis, Minnesota
Charlie Hoag (1931–2012), American professional basketball player
Dutch Hoag (1926–2016), American race car driver
Elizabeth Gorham Hoag (1857–1875), American sorority sister; founding member of Sigma Kappa
Harold Hoag (b. 1966), American professional wrestler
Jan Hoag (b. 1948), American film and television actress
Judith Hoag (b. 1963), American actress
Myril Hoag (1908–1971), American professional baseball player
Ryan Hoag (b. 1979), American professional football player
Tami Hoag (b. 1959), American romance novelist
Truman H. Hoag (1816–1870), American politician

See also
 The Unpleasant Profession of Jonathan Hoag, a novella by Robert A. Heinlein
 Hoag's Object, a galaxy discovered by Arthur Hoag
 Hogue (disambiguation)